João Fernando Santos (born 24 July 1964) is a Portuguese rower. He competed in the men's double sculls event at the 1992 Summer Olympics.

References

1964 births
Living people
Portuguese male rowers
Olympic rowers of Portugal
Rowers at the 1992 Summer Olympics
Place of birth missing (living people)